"Cold Hard Bitch" is the fourth single (second in the United States) by Australian rock group Jet from their 2003 debut album, Get Born. The song was written by band members Chris Cester, Nic Cester, and Cameron Muncey. Heavily inspired by prior heavy bands such as AC/DC, the song is one of the heaviest in the group's catalog, being a tough hard rock tune with a simplistic chord structure.

The song was released in the United States on 9 February 2004 and in Australia on 26 July 2004. In addition to peaking at number 33 in Australia, it topped the US Billboard Mainstream Rock and Modern Rock Tracks charts and reached number 55 on the Billboard Hot 100. In Canada, the song reached number two on the Radio & Records Rock Top 30, while in Europe, it charted in the United Kingdom, peaking at number 34 in September 2004.

Background and single history
Band-members Chris Cester, Nic Cester, and Cameron Muncey composed the tune. An embryonic version of it appeared on Jet's 2002 release Dirty Sweet (also known as Dirty Sweet EP), a four-song work from the band's early days. "Cold Hard Bitch" received a large scale release when the group's debut studio album, Get Born, came out on 14 September 2003.

The group's debut single, "Are You Gonna Be My Girl", became their signature song and gained significant chart success in the US, making it their most successful hit there. That song had considerable pop radio airplay and peaked No. 29 on the Billboard Hot 100. "Cold Hard Bitch" came out several months later and peaked No. 55 on the Hot 100, yet it was more successful on rock and roll radio stations, reaching No. 1 on Billboards Hot Modern Rock Tracks for three weeks. "Cold Hard Bitch" gave the band their only number-one Modern Rock hit in the US: their prior hit, "Are You Gonna Be My Girl", had peaked at No. 3. The single also became their sole No. 1 on the Hot Mainstream Rock Tracks chart, spending eight weeks at the top, whereas their prior hit peaked at No. 7.

Strongly influenced by past hard rock groups such as AC/DC, "Cold Hard Bitch" features a simplistic chord structure that emphasizes the guitar playing and bassline. In terms of a critical response, the song received praise from AllMusic's MacKenzie Wilson, who viewed it as having a "sultry" edge. However, in his other positive review of Get Born, music critic Tim Sendra, also of AllMusic, panned "Cold Hard Bitch". He argued that it was the "only track that really falters" on the release due to it being "silly and mean-spirited", constituting "an ill-advised trip down Nazareth lane" that "leaves the listener with a foul taste in their mouth".

At the APRA Music Awards of 2005, "Cold Hard Bitch" was nominated for Most Performed Australian Work Overseas but lost to "Are You Gonna Be My Girl". In the following year, three Jet tracks were nominated for the same category with "Are You Gonna Be My Girl" again winning over "Cold Hard Bitch" and "Look What You've Done". The music video for the single shows the band performing in a bar, playing pinball, and talking to women, generally giving off a 'guys night out' atmosphere.

The song was produced by the Hothouse team, Craig Harnath and Finn Keane. When the song was performed at Live 8 in Canada in 2005, the name was changed to "You're Like This". It is believed that this was done to cover up the word 'bitch', as they were playing for a benefit concert. Track two, "Ever Lovin' Man", is a cover version of The Loved Ones' hit from July 1966. Track three, "Ain't That a Lotta Love", is a cover of a song written by Homer Banks and William Parker.

Track listings

Charts

Release history

References

2003 songs
2004 singles
Capitol Records singles
Elektra Records singles
Jet (band) songs
Song recordings produced by Dave Sardy
Songs written by Nic Cester
Songs written by Cameron Muncey
Songs written by Chris Cester